Skol Veythrin Karenza (SVK), set up by Movyans Skolyow Meythrin in 2013, is the first full-time Cornish language nursery school with Ofsted registered status. It started in 2010 as a voluntary not-for-profit project run by parents who wanted their children to learn Cornish at early ages. SVK originally ran as a part-time nursery, providing only two hours of bilingual Cornish-English education on Saturdays. In 2012 it was further enlarged, with all-day classes offered every Wednesday. It is located on Cornwall College's day care center at its campus in Camborne in Cornwall, England.

References

Education in Cornwall
Cornish language revival
Cornish language
Celtic medium education